Antti Elias Tuuri (born 1 October 1944, Kauhava, Southern Ostrobothnia) is a Finnish writer, known for his works dealing with Southern Ostrobothnia.

The Äitini-suku-series tells the stories of the Finns who emigrated to the United States. He received the J. H. Erkko Award in 1971 for Asioiden suhteet ja Lauantaina illalla, The Nordic Council's Literature Prize in 1985 for Pohjanmaa, and the Finlandia Prize in 1997 for his novel Lakeuden kutsu. Tuuri has also translated some Icelandic sagas.

Many of his novels have been made into films including Rukajärven tie also known as "Ambush" in English, about the Continuation War 1941–44 in Karelia, Russia and Talvisota, the Winter War 1939–1940. His novel Ikitie was made into the movie The Eternal Road.

External links

 Biography at publisher's website 

1944 births
Living people
People from Kauhava
Finnish male novelists
Finnish dramatists and playwrights
Finnish-language writers
Writers from South Ostrobothnia
Aalto University alumni
Finlandia Prize winners
Nordic Council Literature Prize winners
20th-century Finnish novelists
21st-century Finnish novelists